The 1997 Bash at the Beach was the fourth Bash at the Beach professional wrestling pay-per-view (PPV) event produced by World Championship Wrestling (WCW). It took place on July 13, 1997 from the Ocean Center in Daytona Beach, Florida. As of 2014 the event is available on the WWE Network.

Storylines
The event featured professional wrestling matches that involve different wrestlers from pre-existing scripted feuds and storylines. Professional wrestlers portray villains, heroes, or less distinguishable characters in the scripted events that build tension and culminate in a wrestling match or series of matches.

Event

The first match of the pay-per-view saw Mortis and Wrath defeat Glacier and Ernest Miller. Following Glacier kicking Mortis and Wrath’s manager James Vandenberg off the apron, Mortis hit Glacier with the Cryonic Kick to pick up the victory

The second match was for the WCW Cruiserweight Championship. Chris Jericho retained the championship over Ultimate Dragon after he reversed a hurricanranna into a rollup.

In the following match The Steiner Brothers (Rick Steiner and Scott Steiner) defeated The Great Muta and Masahiro Chono, to earn a shot at the WCW World Tag Team Championship. Scott hit the Frankensteiner on Muta followed by Rick hitting a DDT off the top rope for the pinfall victory.

In a six-man tag match, Juventud Guerrera, Héctor Garza, and Lizmark Jr. next defeated La Parka, Psychosis, and Villano IV. Villano V attempted to switch places with Villano IV during the match, however he was immediately hit with a springboard dropkick into a standing moonsault by Garza, who pinned Villano V for the victory.

The following match was a no disqualification retirement match between Chris Benoit and  The Taskmaster. Jacqueline, who came out with the Taskmaster, got into a fight with him during the match, causing her to break a wooden chair over his head. Benoit used this opportunity to hit a headbutt from the corner, to pick up the victory.

The next match saw Jeff Jarrett defending his WCW United States Heavyweight Championship against Steve McMichael. During the match however, Steve’s wife Queen Debra McMichael turned on him, handing a metal briefcase to Jarrett. She then distracted the referee while Jarrett used the briefcase as a weapon on Steve. Jarrett picked up the victory over Steve, which was followed by a celebration by Debra in the ring.

The next match was scheduled to be New World Order members Randy Savage and Scott Hall facing off against Diamond Dallas Page and his mystery partner. Prior to the match, Page announced his mystery partner to be Curt Hennig who was making his WCW debut. Toward the end of the match, as Hennig was running toward the ropes, Page accidentally held down the ropes, causing Hennig to fall outside the ring, hitting the ring apron on his way to the floor. Hennig then got up and hit Page in the back of the head, before leaving ringside for the remainder of the match. This enabled Hall to hit the Outsider’s Edge followed by Savage’s elbow off the top rope, for the pinfall victory.

In the second to last match, Roddy Piper defeated Ric Flair by submission. During the match both Benoit and McMichael attempted to interfere in the match before referee Mark Curtis ejected both of them. Piper ultimately picked up the victory when Flair tapped out from the sleeper hold.

The final match of the event saw Lex Luger and The Giant taking on nWo members Hollywood Hogan and Dennis Rodman. Luger and Giant picked up the victory when Hogan tapped out to Luger’s Torture Rack.

Results

References

Professional wrestling shows in Florida
1997 in Florida
Events in Daytona Beach, Florida
Bash at the Beach
July 1997 events in the United States
1997 World Championship Wrestling pay-per-view events